Bernard Gilles Penot (1519 in Guyenne – 1617 in Yverdon-les-Bains) was a French Renaissance alchemist and a friend of Nicolas Barnaud.

Penot studied in Basel. Penot came under the influence of Paracelsus through Adam von Bodenstein. He supposedly squandered his entire fortune on his alchemical studies, while searching for the Philosopher's Stone. In the end, he distanced himself from alchemy, which he had previously defended in writing.

Penot occasionally served as doctor in Frankenthal (Pfalz). He travelled a great deal and had a wide network of contacts and correspondents in England, Bohemia and Switzerland, and including Jacob Zwinger and Andreas Libavius. He died impoverished at the hospital in Yverdon-les-Bains (Ifferten), where he had been the city doctor from 1596.

The influential three-volume Theatrum Chemicum from 1602, a compendium of early alchemical writings, included the text of entitled:  Treatise varii, the vera praeparatione et usu Medicamentorum chemicorum (Praefatio, De medicamentis chemicis). According to Didier Kahn he was also the publisher of the Centum quindecim curationes in 1582 which was attributed to Paracelsus.

Works 
Abditorum chymicorum tractatus varii. Frankfurt, 1595.
Apologia chemiae transmutatoriae. Bern, 1608.
Libellus de lapide philosophorum. Frankfurt, 1594.
Extractio mercurii ex auro
Canones philosophici
Quaestiones et responsones philosophicae
Dialogus de arte chemica
Aegidii de Vondis dialogus inter naturam et filium philosophiae
Vademecum Theophrasticum. Magdeburg, 1607.

Further reading 
 Kahn, Didier. Alchimie et paracelsisme en France à la fin de la Renaissance (1567-1625). Cahiers d’Humanisme et Renaissance, 80. Geneva: Droz, 2007.
 Olivier, Eugène. "Bernard Gilles Penot (Du Port), médecin et alchimiste (1519-1617)." Chrysopoeia 5 (1992-1996): 571–668.
 Kühlmann, Wilhelm and Joachim Telle, eds. Der Frühparacelsismus. De Gruyter, 2013. pp. 33ff.
 Ferguson, John Bibliotheca Chemica, vol. 1. Glasgow, 1906. pp. 73ff.
 Schmieder, Karl Christoph. Geschichte der Alchemie. Halle, 1832. p. 297.

Notes

French alchemists
Paracelsians
1519 births
1617 deaths
People from Yverdon-les-Bains
16th-century alchemists
17th-century alchemists